Charles John Forbes (February 10, 1786 – September 22, 1862) was an official in the British Army and political figure in Canada East.

History 
He was born in Gosport, Hampshire, England in 1786 and studied at College of Altona, then in Denmark, now in Germany. In 1805, he joined the Commissariat Department of the British Army. Forbes served in the Mediterranean region, in the Peninsular War and at the Battle of New Orleans. He retired from the army in 1817 but returned to the Commissariat in 1824 and was sent to Nova Scotia. He then served at Montreal, during which time he purchased land near Carillon in Lower Canada, and in Jamaica. After becoming ill, he retired again in 1836 and returned to his property at Carillon. During the Lower Canada Rebellion, Forbes organized and led a group of volunteers who helped put down the rebels at Saint-Benoît in the Lac des Deux Montagnes region. In 1837, he was named a magistrate. He was elected to the Legislative Assembly of the Province of Canada for Two Mountains in a by-election in 1842, after the death of the incumbent member, Colin Robertson.
 
He died at Carillon in 1862.

External links
 

1786 births
1862 deaths
People from Gosport
Royal Army Service Corps officers
British Army personnel of the Napoleonic Wars
British Army personnel of the War of 1812
Members of the Legislative Assembly of the Province of Canada from Canada East
Lower Canada Rebellion people